Canadian singer Abel Tesfaye, known professionally as the Weeknd, has been featured in sixty-two music videos. A noted cinephile, many of his music videos were inspired by various films. From his compilation album Trilogy (2012), Tesfaye released four music videos for the songs "The Knowing", "Rolling Stone", "Wicked Games" and "The Zone", which featured Drake. For his debut studio album Kiss Land (2013), he released five music videos for the title track, "Twenty Eight", "Belong to the World", "Live For" and "Pretty".

For his second studio album Beauty Behind the Madness (2015), he released five music videos for the songs "Often", "The Hills", "Can't Feel My Face", "Tell Your Friends" and "In the Night". Three of the five music videos were directed by Grant Singer. He also released a music video for the remix of "The Hills", which featured Eminem. In 2021, he released an alternate music video for "Can't Feel My Face".

In support of his third studio album Starboy (2016), Tesfaye released six music videos for the title track, "False Alarm", "Party Monster", "Reminder", "I Feel It Coming" and "Secrets". He also released the short film Mania, which featured additional songs from the album. The music video for the title track won the MTV Europe Music Award for Best Video. For his debut extended play My Dear Melancholy, (2018), Tesfaye released two music videos for "Call Out My Name" and "Try Me"; the latter video was self-directed.

For his fourth studio album After Hours (2020), Tesfaye released seven music videos of the songs "Heartless", "Blinding Lights", "In Your Eyes", "Until I Bleed Out", "Snowchild", "Too Late" and "Save Your Tears". He also released a short film for the title track and a lyric/music video for the remix of "Blinding Lights" with Rosalía. In all of the videos for the After Hours era, Tesfaye played a singular character donned in a red suit and a specific hairstyle. Four of the seven music videos, as well as the short film, were directed by Anton Tammi; while two of the videos were directed by Cliqua. The original video for "Blinding Lights" won the MTV Video Music Awards for Video of the Year and Best R&B Video.

To promote his fifth studio album Dawn FM (2022), The Weeknd released six music video's up til now, for the songs "Take My Breath", "Sacrifice", "Gasoline", "Out of Time", "How Do I Make You Love Me?" and "Is There Someone Else?". A part of the title track "Dawn FM" is included in the "Sacrifice" music video. He also released two one-minute trailers for the album, and made a music video for the remix of "Sacrifice" by Swedish House Mafia on the deluxe version of the album, Dawn FM (Alternate World), and a music video with Swedish House Mafia, for the song Moth to a Flame, also on Dawn FM (Alternate World). Five of the eight music video's were (co-)directed by Cliqua. 

Tesfaye has appeared in several television shows, including co-writing and starring in an episode of American Dad! and making a guest appearance in Robot Chicken. After appearing in the concert film Taylor Swift: The 1989 World Tour Live and the documentary Michael Jackson's Journey from Motown to Off the Wall, Tesfaye made his feature film debut in Uncut Gems (2019). He was later the focus of the 2021 documentary The Show, which followed his preparations for the Super Bowl LV halftime show. His first concert film, The Weeknd: Live at SoFi Stadium which showcases his After Hours til Dawn Tour is scheduled for release exclusively on HBO Max on February 25.

Music videos

Filmography

Film

Television

References 

Videography
Canadian filmographies
Male actor filmographies
Videographies of Canadian artists